Deh Fazel (also Romanized as Deh Fāẕel) is a village in Rostaq Rural District, in the Central District of Neyriz County, Fars Province, Iran. At the 2006 census, its population was 86, in 25 families.

References 

Populated places in Neyriz County